The 1890 Columbus Solons season was a season in American baseball. The team finished with a 79–55 record, second place in the American Association.

Regular season

Season standings

Record vs. opponents

Notable transactions 
 May 8, 1890: John Munyan was released by the Solons.

Roster

Player stats

Batting

Starters by position 
Note: Pos = Position; G = Games played; AB = At bats; H = Hits; Avg. = Batting average; HR = Home runs; RBI = Runs batted in

Other batters 
Note: G = Games played; AB = At bats; H = Hits; Avg. = Batting average; HR = Home runs; RBI = Runs batted in

Pitching

Starting pitchers 
Note: G = Games pitched; IP = Innings pitched; W = Wins; L = Losses; ERA = Earned run average; SO = Strikeouts

Relief pitchers 
Note: G = Games pitched; W = Wins; L = Losses; SV = Saves; ERA = Earned run average; SO = Strikeouts

Notes

References 
 1890 Columbus Solons team page at Baseball Reference

Columbus Solons
Columbus Solons season
Columbus Solons